Mount McBride is a mountain located on Vancouver Island in British Columbia, Canada.

Mount McBride is one of two peaks in British Columbia named for BC Premier Sir Richard McBride.  The other is Mount Sir Richard.  There is a second Mount McBride—named for Captain Kenneth Gilbert McBride of The Seaforth Highlanders of Canada, a Canadian officer killed in action during the Second World War—elsewhere in BC and yet another in the Yukon.  

The first ascent is uncertain but may have been Leroy Stirling Cokely in 1926.

References

Sources

External links

Two-thousanders of British Columbia
Vancouver Island Ranges
Nootka Land District